The 1942 Masters Tournament was the ninth Masters Tournament, held April 9–13 at Augusta National Golf Club in Augusta, Georgia.

Byron Nelson, the 1937 champion, won an 18-hole playoff by one stroke over runner-up Ben Hogan. Down by three strokes after four holes, Nelson played the final fourteen holes at five-under-par to claim the winner's share of $1,500 from a $5,000 purse. The playoff was refereed by tournament host Bobby Jones. Nelson was the second to win a second Masters, joining Horton Smith.

On Sunday, Nelson started the final round with a three stroke lead, with a gallery of 6,000 on the grounds. Hogan birdied 18 to shoot 70 (−2) and 280 (−8) and waited for Nelson to finish the last three holes. Nelson found a greenside bunker at 17 and bogeyed to fall into a tie. He had a  birdie putt to win on the 72nd hole, but left it short and tapped in to force the Monday playoff.

It was the second playoff at the Masters; the first in 1935 was 36 holes.

This was the last Masters until 1946; it was not played from 1943 to 1945, due to World War II.

Field
1. Masters champions
Jimmy Demaret (9), Ralph Guldahl (2,9,10), Byron Nelson (2,6,9,10,12), Henry Picard (6,10), Gene Sarazen (2,4,6,9,10,12), Horton Smith (9,10), Craig Wood (2,9,10)

2. U.S. Open champions
Tommy Armour (4,6), Billy Burke, Bobby Jones (3,4,5), Lawson Little (3,5,9,10)

3. U.S. Amateur champions
Bud Ward (10,11,a)

4. British Open champions
Denny Shute (6,9,10,12)

5. British Amateur champions
Charlie Yates (a)

6. PGA champions
Paul Runyan (10)

7. Members of the U.S. Ryder Cup team
Not held

8. Members of the U.S. Walker Cup team
Not held

9. Top 30 players and ties from the 1941 Masters Tournament
Sammy Byrd (10), Harry Cooper, Ed Dudley (10), Jim Ferrier (10), Jim Foulis, Willie Goggin, Jimmy Hines (10,12), Ben Hogan (10,12), Gene Kunes (10), Lloyd Mangrum (10,12), Jug McSpaden (10), Toney Penna, Jack Ryan, Felix Serafin, Sam Snead (10,12), Jimmy Thomson

Dick Chapman (3,a), Vic Ghezzi (6,10,12), Clayton Heafner (10), Ray Mangrum, Dick Metz (10) and Sam Parks Jr. (2) did not play

10. Top 30 players and ties from the 1941 U.S. Open
Herman Barron, Jerry Gianferante, Dutch Harrison, Herman Keiser, Johnny Morris, Johnny Palmer, Joe Zarhardt

Johnny Bulla, Henry Ransom and Harry Todd did not play.

11. 1941 U.S. Amateur quarter-finalists
Steve Kovach (a)

Pat Abbott (a), Ray Billows (a), Ted Bishop (a), Lou Jennings (a), Bruce McCormick (a), Bobby Riegel (a) did not play.

12. 1941 PGA Championship quarter-finalists

13. One amateur, not already qualified, selected by a ballot of ex-U.S. Amateur champions
Wilford Wehrle (a) did not play.

14. One professional, not already qualified, selected by a ballot of ex-U.S. Open champions
Bobby Cruickshank

15. Two players, not already qualified, based on performances in the winter part of the 1941 PGA Tour
Chick Harbert, Chandler Harper

Round summaries

First round 
Thursday, April 9, 1942

Source:

Second round 
Friday, April 10, 1942

Source:

Third round 
Saturday, April 11, 1942

Source:

Final round
Sunday, April 12, 1942

Final leaderboard

Sources:

Scorecard 

Cumulative tournament scores, relative to par
Source:

Playoff 
Monday, April 13, 1942

Scorecard 

Source:
{|class="wikitable" span = 50 style="font-size:85%;
|-
|style="background: Red;" width=10|
|Eagle
|style="background: Pink;" width=10|
|Birdie
|style="background: PaleGreen;" width=10|
|Bogey
|style="background: Green;" width=10|
|Double bogey
|}

References

External links 
Masters.com – past winners and results
 Augusta.com – 1942 Masters leaderboard and scorecards

1942
1942 in golf
1942 in American sports
1942 in sports in Georgia (U.S. state)
April 1942 sports events